HMS Medusa was one of three 2-gun Merlin-class paddle packet boat built for the Royal Navy during the 1830s. She was converted into a tugboat in 1861–1862 and sold for scrap in 1872.

Description
The ship's tonnage was 889  tons burthen. The Medusa class was fitted with a pair of steam engines, rated at 312 nominal horsepower, that drove their paddlewheels. The ships were armed with a pair of 6-pounder carronades.

Construction and career
Medusa, the fourth ship of her name to serve in the Royal Navy, was ordered on 10 March 1838, laid down two months later at Pembroke Dockyard, Wales, and launched on 31 October of that same year. She was completed on 12 August 1839 and had been commissioned four days earlier. The ship was initially based at Liverpool for packet service in the Irish Sea. Medusa was modified in 1848 for service in the Mediterranean Sea.

On 28 November 1849, Medusa ran aground at Marseille, Bouches-du-Rhône, France, whilst conveying mails from London to India. She was refloated and put back to Marseille with a broken rudder. The mails were forwarded in the French Government steamship Leonidas. On 14 March 1851, Medusa collided with the British brig Caroline in Grand Harbour, Malta, as she was leaving port. A court found Medusa was to blame and awarded compensation to the owners of Caroline.

Medusa was converted into a tugboat in 1861–1862 at Woolwich. She was paid off on 15 December 1871 and sold for scrap on 17 February 1872.

Notes

References

 

Merlin-class packet boat
1838 ships
Ships built in Pembroke Dock
Maritime incidents in December 1849